Syzygium diffusum is a species of plant in the family Myrtaceae. It is endemic to Fiji.

References

Endemic flora of Fiji
diffusum
Least concern plants
Taxonomy articles created by Polbot